The Fatimid Expedition to Morocco was led by the Fatimid general Jawhar and Ziri ibn Manad between 958 and 960. It was directed against the rulers in Morocco who had recognised the suzerainty of the Caliph of Cordoba.

Background
After the end of Idrisid rule in Fez one of the princes established himself in the Rif in the 930s, he recognised the authority of the Fatimids until his death in 948. In the 950s northern Morocco was transformed into an Umayyad protectorate.

Siege
In 958 Jawhar occupied Sijilmasa after which its ruler Ibn Wasul evacuated the city, however he was delivered to Jawhar and the coins in his mint were struck in the name of the Fatimid Caliph. In the winter of 958 Ziri ibn Manad directed a siege against Fez and in November 959 he overcame the walls of Fez, two days after he captured the emir and took him prisoner. Fez and Sijilmasa were captured and the Fatimid realm was extended to the Atlantic. The amir of Fez and Ibn Wasul of Sijilmasa were brought along in cages and the Idrisids were forced to provide hostages. After this expedition only Tangier and Ceuta were held by the Caliph of Cordoba.

Aftermath
In 973 the Umayyad general Ghalib invaded Morocco, he reasserted Umayyad suzerainty in Morocco by conquering Fez and forcing the Banu Gannun to switch their allegiance from the Fatimids to the Umayyads.

References

Battles involving the Fatimid Caliphate
History of Morocco
10th century in Morocco